The perennial flower Abronia latifolia or Abronia arenaria is a species of sand-verbena known commonly as the coastal, or yellow sand-verbena. It is native to the west coast of North America, from southern California to the Canada–United States border.

The plant bears attractive neatly rounded heads of small, bright golden flowers. The individual flowers have no petals; rather, they are composed of yellow bracts forming a trumpet-shaped calyx about the stamens. It bears a small, winged fruit. The plant grows in succulent mats on sand or other coastal substrate. The roots are stout, fusiform and often several feet long. These roots are edible, traditionally eaten by the Chinook Indians. This plant is seen exhibiting psammophory, a method by which plants save themselves from herbivores by attracting sand to their body making them difficult to be eaten. It needs salt water, not fresh water, and will not tolerate extreme drought.

References

Sources
Munz, Philip A. (2003). Introduction to Shore Wildflowers of California, Oregon, and Washington. Berkeley: University of California Press.

External links
USDA Plants Profile
eFloras Info Page
Jepson Manual Treatment

latifolia
Flora of California
Flora of Oregon
Flora of Washington (state)